Arthur Hobbs  (born November 18, 1989) is an American football defensive back for the San Antonio Gunslingers of the National Arena League (NAL). Hobbs attended Mount Miguel High School in Spring Valley, California. He first enrolled at Grossmont College before transferring to the University of Nebraska at Kearney. Hobbs has also been a member of the San Diego Chargers, Hamilton Tiger-Cats, Calgary Stampeders, Orlando Predators and Tampa Bay Storm.

Professional career

San Diego Chargers
Hobbs was signed by the San Diego Chargers of the National Football League (NFL) on May 14, 2012 after going undrafted in the 2012 NFL Draft. He was released by the Chargers on September 1, 2012. He was signed to the Chargers' practice squad on December 26, 2012.

Hamilton Tiger-Cats
Hobbs signed with the Hamilton Tiger-Cats of the Canadian Football League (CFL) on April 11, 2013. In his first season in the CFL Hobbs contributed 32 defensive tackles, 2 special teams tackles and 2 interceptions. The Tiger-Cats lost in the championship game that season. He was released by the Tiger-Cats on May 21, 2014.

Orlando Predators
Hobbs was signed by the Orlando Predators of the AFL on October 2, 2014. On May 10, 2016, Hobbs was placed on reassignment. On May 17, 2016, Hobbs was assigned to the Predators again. On May 19, 2016, Hobbs was placed on reassignment. On May 25, 2016, Hobbs was assigned to the Predators. On June 28, 2016, Hobbs was placed on reassignment. On July 7, 2016, Hobbs was assigned to the Predators.

Calgary Stampeders
Hobbs signed a contract with the Calgary Stampeders of the CFL on January 25, 2015. He was released by the Stampeders on May 5, 2015.

Tampa Bay Storm
Hobbs was assigned to the Tampa Bay Storm on February 14, 2017. The Storm folded in December 2017.

Albany Empire
On March 21, 2018, Hobbs was assigned to the Albany Empire.

Atlantic City Blackjacks
On March 11, 2019, Hobbs was assigned to the Atlantic City Blackjacks.

Albany Empire (NAL)
On July 30, 2021, Hobbs signed with the Albany Empire of the National Arena League (NAL). On November 1, 2021, Hobbs re-signed with the Empire.

San Antonio Gunslingers
On November 4, 2022, Hobbs signed with the San Antonio Gunslingers of the National Arena League (NAL).

References

External links

Living people
1989 births
Players of American football from San Diego
Players of Canadian football from San Diego
American football defensive backs
Grossmont Griffins football players
Nebraska–Kearney Lopers football players
Canadian football defensive backs
African-American players of American football
African-American players of Canadian football
San Diego Chargers players
Hamilton Tiger-Cats players
Calgary Stampeders players
Orlando Predators players
Tampa Bay Storm players
Albany Empire (AFL) players
Atlantic City Blackjacks players
21st-century African-American sportspeople
20th-century African-American people